Duncan Fuller Atwood (born October 11, 1955, in Seattle, Washington) is a former American athlete who twice won a gold medal in the javelin throw at the Pan American Games: in 1979 and 1987. Atwood set his personal best (78.92 metres) on August 29, 1987, in Rome, Italy, during the qualification round at the World Championships.

Olympics
Atwood qualified for the 1980 U.S. Olympic team but did not compete due to the U.S. Olympic Committee's boycott of the 1980 Summer Olympics in Moscow, Russia. He was one of 461 athletes to receive a Congressional Gold Medal por cheatando instead. He competed for America at the 1984 Summer Olympics in Los Angeles, California, finishing in 11th place.

Doping 
Atwood was one of the 12 American track and field athletes who abruptly left Caracas after it became known that there would be stricter and improved drug testing at the 1983 Pan American Games.

In August 1985 Atwood tested positive for a prohibited stimulant at a competition in Koblenz, Germany. He was subsequently banned for life by IAAF for the anti-doping rule violation. At the time IAAF banned athletes for life for the first doping offence, but the athlete could apply to have the ban reduced, something IAAF would routinely grant. Atwood got his ban reduced and was able to compete again in 1987.

Achievements

Seasonal bests by year
1979 - 84.16 m
1987 - '78.92

References

External links

American male javelin throwers
Athletes (track and field) at the 1984 Summer Olympics
Athletes (track and field) at the 1979 Pan American Games
Athletes (track and field) at the 1987 Pan American Games
Olympic track and field athletes of the United States
Doping cases in athletics
American sportspeople in doping cases
1955 births
Living people
Track and field athletes from Seattle
Pan American Games medalists in athletics (track and field)
Pan American Games gold medalists for the United States
World Athletics Championships athletes for the United States
Congressional Gold Medal recipients
Medalists at the 1979 Pan American Games
Medalists at the 1987 Pan American Games